Melvin Allys "Bert" Gallia (October 14, 1891 – March 19, 1976) was a pitcher in Major League Baseball from 1912 to 1920. He played for the Washington Senators, St. Louis Browns, and Philadelphia Phillies.

Gallia grew up in Woodsboro, Texas. As an 18-year-old student at St. Louis College (later St. Mary's University) in San Antonio in 1909, Gallia became famed for striking out Ty Cobb in an exhibition game held at the St. Louis College campus.

References

Chicoine, Stephen, article on Bert Gallia's baseball career from Southwestern Historical Quarterly at www.freedomhistory.com

External links

1891 births
1976 deaths
Major League Baseball pitchers
Washington Senators (1901–1960) players
St. Louis Browns players
St. Mary's Rattlers baseball players
Philadelphia Phillies players
Baseball players from Texas
Beeville Orange Growers players
Laredo Bermudas players
Kansas City Blues (baseball) players
People from Refugio County, Texas
People from Devine, Texas
People from Beeville, Texas